No Colder Place is a mystery novel written by S. J. Rozan and published by St. Martin's Paperbacks in 1997, which later went on to win the Anthony Award for Best Novel in 1998.

References 

Anthony Award-winning works
American mystery novels
1997 American novels